In Greek mythology, Thissaeus was the son of Zeus and Chrysogenia, daughter of the river-god Peneus.

Note

References 

 Pseudo-Clement, Recognitions from Ante-Nicene Library Volume 8, translated by Smith, Rev. Thomas. T. & T. Clark, Edinburgh. 1867. Online version at theio.com

Children of Zeus